Edward James Bossward (1825–1883) was an organ builder based in Birmingham, England.

Life

He was born in Hayes in 1825 and baptised on 22 May 1825, the son of Thomas Bossward and Jane Collinridge. He married Eliza Gisborne in 1848 in King’s Norton, and they had ten children.

He trained as an organ builder with J.C. Bishop and then worked for William Hill. He came to Birmingham with Hill to work on the organ in Birmingham Town Hall, and to care for it after completion. 

In 1847 he set up business on his own, first at 30 Oliver Road, and later at 80 Alston Street, Ladywood. In 1869 he was declared bankrupt. One of his pupils Walter James Bird continued the business after he died in 1883.

Works

He installed or worked on organs at the following churches:
St Alphege's Church, Solihull 1850 Alterations and extension
St Mary's Church, Moseley 1853. New Organ.
All Saints Church, Allesley. 1863
St Jude's Church, Birmingham 1867 New Organ now in St Michael and All Angels Church, Exeter 
Trinity Wesleyan Chapel, Wolverhampton 1867 New Organ
St Alphege's Church, Solihull 1868 Alterations and extension
St Philip’s Church, Birmingham 1869 Cleaning, repairs and improvements.
Lichfield Cathedral 1881 Overhaul

References

1825 births
1883 deaths
Organ builders of the United Kingdom
People from Birmingham, West Midlands
Date of birth unknown
Date of death missing